Howard Hu is an American physician-scientist, internist, and specialist in preventive medicine and environmental health. He is currently the Flora L. Thornton Chair and Professor of Population and Public Health Sciences at the Keck School of Medicine at the University of Southern California. He previously taught at the Harvard T.H. Chan School of Public Health, University of Michigan School of Public Health, and University of Toronto, where he served as founding dean of the Dalla Lana School of Public Health. Hu has served on the Board of Directors for Physicians for Human Rights, where he was involved in four of the nonprofit's fact-finding missions.

Early life and education 
Hu was born to Chinese immigrant parents. His mother grew up in Europe as the daughter of a Chinese diplomat. His father worked as an engineer and encouraged Howard to pursue medicine although his "first love was English literature." Hu's interest in environmental and occupational health was sparked at an early age after he was exposed to asbestos while working as a torch burner at a shipyard.

Hu attended Brown University where he studied Biology and graduated with a B.Sc. in 1976. He completed his M.D. at Albert Einstein College of Medicine and his M.P.H at the Harvard School of Public Health, both in 1980. He subsequently completed an M.Sc. and Ph.D. in epidemiology at Harvard in 1986 and 1990, respectively.

Career 
From 1988 to 2006, Hu was affiliated with the Department of Medicine at Harvard Medical School/Brigham & Women's Hospital and the Department of Environmental Health at Harvard School of Public Health. In 2006, he was recruited to the University of Michigan School of Public Health, where he held dual appointments in Epidemiology and Medicine. From 2009 to 2012 he held the NSF International Endowed Department Chair at the university.

In 2012, he was appointed Director and Professor at the Dalla Lana School of Public Health at the University of Toronto. In 2013, the school became a faculty with Hu serving as founding Dean. Hu held the position until 2017. After spending two years as Affiliate Professor at the University of Washington, Hu joined the University of Southern California's Keck School of Medicine as chair of the Department of Population and Public Health Sciences.

Human rights work 
Hu serves on the Advisory Council of Physicians for Human Rights, US-based human rights NGO that uses medicine and science to document and advocate against human rights violations worldwide. He has participated in four of PHR's fact finding missions which focused on tear gas use in South Korea (1987), use of chemical weapons against Iraqi Kurds (1988), violations of medical neutrality in Burma (1990), and potentially toxic effects of mining operations on indigenous Mam people in Western Guatemala (2009).

Hu additionally served as chair of the Research Commission for International Physicians for the Prevention of Nuclear War.

References

External links 

 

Living people
Year of birth missing (living people)
Physician-scientists
American epidemiologists
American academics of Chinese descent
Brown University alumni
Albert Einstein College of Medicine alumni
Harvard School of Public Health alumni
Harvard School of Public Health faculty
University of Michigan faculty
Academic staff of the University of Toronto
Keck School of Medicine of USC faculty
Fellows of the American Physical Society